The South West Sydney Australian Football Club (formerly, the Moorebank Sports Club) is an Australian rules football club based in the South Western Suburbs of Sydney, Australia. Nicknamed the Magpies, they currently have teams in the Second Division, Fourth Division, Fifth Division, Women's Division and Under 19s of the Sydney AFL league.

Moorebank's home ground is Rosedale Park located in the south-western Sydney suburb of Warwick Farm.

References

External links
 

Australian rules football clubs in Sydney